Appendicula elegans is a species of orchids. It is found in Malesia (Java, Lesser Sunda Islands, Sumatra).

References

External links 

Eriinae
Orchids of Java
Orchids of Sumatra
Flora of the Lesser Sunda Islands
Plants described in 1857